Obereoides cicatricosus is a species of beetle in the family Cerambycidae. It was described by Dmytro Zajciw in 1968. It is known from Brazil.

References

Forsteriini
Beetles described in 1968